This is a list of television programs currently and formerly broadcast by NewsNation and WGN America, a Chicago-based cable channel.

Current programming

Syndicated series

News programming

Religious programming
These programs air in early morning Sunday timeslots under paid programming arrangements with each ministry.
Catholic Mass
In Search of the Lord's Way
The Jewish Jesus
Joseph Prince (daily)
Manna-fest with Perry Stone
Michael Youssef
Tomorrow's World 1 (1998–present)
Worship Anew

Former programming

Original programming

Original

Acquired

Syndicated series

The Andy Griffith Show (1978–99)
Bewitched (1978–83; 1990–94; 1996–97; 2008–12)
Daniel Boone (1978–80)
The Dick Van Dyke Show (1978–83; 1985–91)
Family Affair (1978–82)
The Flintstones (1978–81, 1991–95)
Gilligan's Island (1978–82)
I Dream of Jeannie (1978–85; 1990–92, 2008–12)
Love American Style (1978–81)
My Three Sons (1978–80)
The New Soupy Sales Show (1978–79)
The Odd Couple (1978–87; 1993–94)
The Phil Donahue Show (1978–82)
Soul Train (1978–September 29, 2008)
Wild Kingdom (1978–82; 1984–87)
Bugs Bunny and Friends (1979–90)
Carol Burnett and Friends (1979–87)
The Cisco Kid (1979–88)
Dennis the Menace (1959 TV series) (1979–80; 1982–84)
Groovie Goolies and Friends (1979–80, 1983–84)
In Search of... (1979–86)
The Lone Ranger (1979–92)
Maude (1979–80)
McHale's Navy (1979–80)
Star Blazers (1979–80)
Star Trek (1979–80)
Zane Grey Theater (1979–85)
The $50,000 Pyramid (1981)
Adventures of Superman (1980–89)
Barney Miller (1980–88; 2007–10)
The Bullwinkle Show (1980–83; 1993; April 18-September 26, 2009)
Good Times (1980–90)
Hollywood Squares (1980–81)
Independent Network News/USA Tonight (1980–90, produced by sister station WPIX in New York)
Kung Fu (1980–90)
The Mike Douglas Show (1980–81)
The Phil Silvers Show (1980–84)
Prisoner: Cell Block H (1980–82)
Scooby-Doo (1980–86)
Solid Gold (1980–84)
Welcome Back, Kotter (1980–91)
America's Top 10 (1981–86)
Best of Saturday Night (1981–83)
Hogan's Heroes (1981–84; 1986–93)
The Incredible Hulk (1981–82)
Laverne & Shirley (1981–88)
The Lawrence Welk Show (1981–82)
Little House on the Prairie (1981–89)
The Muppet Show (1981–88)
The New You Asked for It (1981–83)
The Pink Panther Show (1981–84)
Rhoda (1981–82; 1984–85; 1987–88)
Sergeant Preston of the Yukon (1981–82)
Tarzan (1981–84)
At the Movies (1982–90)
The Big Valley (1982–87)
Charlie's Angels (1982–85; 1988–91, 1995–97, 2009–12)
The Jeffersons (1982–90; 1992–96)
Rawhide (1982–88)
Soap (1982–92)
Super Friends (1982–87)
The Twilight Zone (1959) (1982–94)
Alice (1983–89)
Alvin and the Chipmunks (1983–84)
The Beverly Hillbillies (1983–88; 2003–11)
Chico and the Man (1983–84)
Fantasy Island (1983–86, 1989–90)
Lou Grant (1983–88; 1991–93)
The Love Boat (1983–92)
One Day at a Time (1983–86; 1988–91)
Rowan & Martin's Laugh-In (1983–84)
Tales from the Darkside (1983–91, 2000–01, 2008–13)
WKRP in Cincinnati (1983–90, 2008–September 6, 2009)
The Abbott and Costello Show (1984–85; 1990–91)
The Adventures of William Tell (1984–85)
Archie Bunker's Place (1984–90)
Benson (1984–89)
The Dukes of Hazzard (1984–85; 1988–89; 1991)
Family (1984–85)
The Greatest American Hero (1984–86)
Greatest Sports Legends (1984–86)
Guilty or Innocent (1984)
Heathcliff (1984–87)
Leave It to Beaver (1984–85; 1987–92)
Lifestyles of the Rich and Famous (1984–87; 1991–94)
The Tony Randall Show (1984; 1987–88)
The Waltons (1984–88)
The Wild Wild West (1984–93)
Cannon (1985–87)
Carson's Comedy Classics (1985–86, 1988–90)
Dempsey and Makepeace (1985–86)
Fame (1985–87; 1994–97)
FTV (1985–86)
G.I. Joe: A Real American Hero (1985–89)
It's a Great Life (1985–86)
It's a Living (1985–88)
M.A.S.K. (1985–87, 1990–91)
Police Story (1985–90)
Puttin' on the Hits (1985–88)
SCTV (1985; 1987–90)
Star Games (1985–86)
Terrytoons (1985)
The Transformers (1985–88)
The Bob Newhart Show (1986–87; 1990; 1992–93)
The Facts of Life (1986–92)
Falcon Crest (1986–87)
Ghostbusters (1986–89)
The Honeymooners (1986–99, 2008–09)
Jem and the Holograms (1986–89)
Magnum, P.I. (1986–92, 1996, 2004–07)
One Big Family (1986–87)
Photon (1986–87)
Smurfs' Adventures (1986–89)
Trapper John, M.D. (1986–91)
What a Country! (1986–87)
The White Shadow (1986–87, 1992–94)
You Write the Songs (1986–87)
Adventures of Teddy Ruxpin (1987–88)
BraveStarr (1987–89)
Bustin' Loose (1987–88)
Captain Power and the Soldiers of the Future (1987–88)
Charles in Charge (1987–92, 1994–95, 1998–2002)
Cheers (1987–90, 2009–12)
Geraldo (1987–98)
Mama's Family (1987–88)
Popeye (1987–88)
Spiral Zone (1987–89)
Star Search (1987–95)
Visionaries: Knights of the Magical Light (1987–88)
Fun House (1988–90)
Gumby (1988–90)
Hill Street Blues (1988–90)
Monsters (1988–91)
The New Yogi Bear Show (1988–90)
Night Court (1988–97)
Runaway with the Rich and Famous (1988–94)
She's the Sheriff (1988–89)
T. and T. (1988–90)
Triple Threat (1988–89)
Chip 'n Dale: Rescue Rangers (1989–92)
DuckTales (1989–92)
The Joan Rivers Show (1989–93)
Newhart (1989–90, 1995–96, 2008–10)
Remote Control (1989–90)
RollerGames (1989–90)
21 Jump Street (1990–91)
Eischied (1990–91)
Hangin' In (1990–91)
Inch High, Private Eye (1990–91)
It Takes a Thief (1990–91)
The Space Kidettes (1990–91)
St. Elsewhere (1990–91)
Super Force (1990–91)
Wake, Rattle & Roll (1990–91)
WCW Pro Wrestling (1990–91; localized version branded as "WCW Pro Chicago")
Wheelie and the Chopper Bunch (1990–91)
Young Samson (1990–91)
Gidget (1991–93)
Kidd Video (1991–92)
Kojak (1991–95)
Now it Can Be Told (1991–92)
Saban's Adventures of the Little Mermaid (1991–93)
Saved by the Bell (1991–99)
Street Justice (1991–93)
Under 18 Not Admitted (1991)
Video Power (1991–92)
Matlock (September 1991 – 2014)
The Apollo Comedy Hour (1992–95)
Captain N & The Video Game Masters (1992–93)
The Dennis Miller Show (1992)
Designing Women (1992–94)
Highlander: The Series (1992–98)
Perry Mason (1992–96)
Prime Suspect (1992–94)
That Girl (1992–95)
The Three Stooges (1992–93)
California Dreams (1993–99; 2003)
Court TV: Inside America's Courts (1993–96)
Emergency Call (1993–94)
Garfield and Friends (1993–94)
The Hallo Spencer Show (1993–94)
The Jane Whitney Show (1993–94)
MotorWeek (1993–96)
The Partridge Family (1993)
Renegade (1993–96)
Stunt Dawgs (1993–94)
Beach Clash (1994–95)
Boogies Diner (1994–95)
Can We Shop?! (1994)
The Charles Perez Show (1994–96)
Dennis the Menace (1986 TV series) (1994–96)
Love Connection (1994–95)
Quincy, M.E. (1994–96)
The Rat Patrol (1994–96)
The Road (1994–95)
Simon & Simon (1994–98)
Superhuman Samurai Syber-Squad (1994–95)
T. J. Hooker (1994–95)
Black Sheep Squadron (1995)
Family Matters (1995–2003)
Hercules: The Legendary Journeys (1995–2000)
In the Heat of the Night (1995–2001, 2003–05, September 15, 2008–July 16, 2022)
One West Waikiki (1995–96)
Out of the Blue (1995–96)
TaleSpin (1995)
Xena: Warrior Princess (1995-2001)
The Adventures of Sinbad (1996–99)
Beauty and the Beast (1996–97)
Beverly Hills, 90210 (1996–98)
Bzzz! (1996–97, 2000–01)
Empty Nest (1996–99)
Wiseguy (1996–98)
The Woody Woodpecker Show (1996–97)
Coach (1997–99, 2008–09)
Earth: Final Conflict (1997–2002)
Night Man (1997–99, 2001–02)
The Streets of San Francisco (1997)
Blossom (1998–99)
Full House (1998–2003)
Hawaii Five-O (1998–2000)
MacGyver (1998-2002)
Malibu, CA (1998-2001)
Webster (1998–99)
Beastmaster (1999-2004)
Caroline in the City (1999–2002)
The Cosby Show (1999–2010)
The Fresh Prince of Bel-Air (1999–2004)
Knight Rider (1999-2000)
The Lost World (1999-2004)
The Parent 'Hood (1999–2002)
Pensacola: Wings of Gold (1999-2000)
The Wayans Bros. (1999-2002)
7th Heaven (2000–02; 2009–10)
Andromeda (2000–05)
Change of Heart (2000–03)
Cleopatra 2525 (2000–01)
Clueless (2000–02)
Jack of All Trades (2000)
Street Smarts (2000–05)
Suddenly Susan (2000–03)
Total Recall 2070 (2000)
The 5th Wheel (2001–04)
City Guys (2001–03)
ElimiDate (2001–06)
Mutant X (2001–05)
Adventure Inc. (2002–03)
Beyond with James van Praagh (2002–03)
Celebrity Justice (2002–05)
Cybill (2002–06)
Happy Days (2002–08)
Home Improvement (2002–07)
Will & Grace (2002–05)
The Addams Family (2003)
Becker (2003–08)
The Rockford Files (2003–07)
The Sharon Osbourne Show (2003–04)
Maximum Exposure (2004–07)
The Twilight Zone (2002) (2004–06)
Unexplained Mysteries (2004–05)
24 (2005–September 27, 2008)
Farscape (2005–06)
Moesha (2005–07)
Sex and the City (2005–07)
America's Funniest Home Videos (Fuentes/Fugelsang and Bergeron runs only) (2006–17)
American Idol Rewind (2006–September 29, 2008)
Da Vinci's Inquest (2006–September 29, 2008)
Funniest Pets & People (2006–09)
Homicide: Life on the Street (September 2006–September 2009)
Even Stevens (September 18, 2006 – September 11, 2008)
Lizzie McGuire (September 18, 2006 – September 12, 2008)
Scrubs (September 18, 2006 – 2013)
Chappelle's Show (2007–10)
Corner Gas (2007–September 7, 2009)
Nash Bridges (2007–10)
Reno 911! (2007–10)
The Steve Wilkos Show (2007–September 11, 2009)
Toni On! (2007–10, produced by sister station WPIX in New York)
3rd Rock from the Sun (2008–10)
ALF (2008–December 27, 2009)
Around the World for Free (2008–09)
Boston Legal (2008–10)
Whacked Out Videos (2008–10)
Hollywood & Dine (April 18, 2008–September 2010)
Walker, Texas Ranger (2008—19)
NewsRadio (October 4, 2008 – 2009)
Legend of the Seeker (November 1, 2008–September 2010)
The Bob and Tom Show (2009–10)
Bones (2009–11, September 29, 2012 – 2016)
Smash Cuts (2009–10)
Star Trek: The Next Generation (2009–11)
WWE Superstars (2009–11)
American Gladiators (2008 version; June 25–September 21, 2009)
Sister, Sister (September 11, 2009 – May 11, 2011)
South Park (September 11, 2009 – September 9, 2012)
Law & Order: Criminal Intent (September 28, 2009 – 2015)
Dharma & Greg (2010–14)
Mad About You (2010–11, 2014)
Monk (2010–12)
Curb Your Enthusiasm (September 13, 2010 – September 10, 2011)
Entourage (September 13, 2010 – September 10, 2011)
The New Adventures of Old Christine (September 13, 2010 – 2013)
How I Met Your Mother (September 14, 2010 – 2021)
The Unit (September 25, 2010 – September 8, 2012)
Just Shoot Me! (September 26, 2010 – 2011)
'Til Death (September 12, 2011 – 2014)
Futurama (September 19, 2011 – 2014)
It's Always Sunny in Philadelphia (September 19, 2011 – September 14, 2014)
Rules of Engagement (September 10, 2012 – 2018)
Bloopers! (September 15, 2012 – 2013)
The Bill Cunningham Show1 (September 17, 2012 – 2013)
30 Rock (2013–17)
Parks and Recreation (September 9, 2013 – 2017)
Law & Order (January 1, 2014 - September 2017)
Raising Hope (September 19, 2014 – 2018)
Person of Interest (September 5, 2015 – 2021)
Elementary (2015–20, September 2021 – September 2022)
Cops (2016–2020)
M*A*S*H (March 2, 2017 – 2021)
Murder, She Wrote (2018–20)
Ring Warriors (September 15 - December 22, 2018)
Married... with Children (September 15, 2018 – 2021)
JAG (July 4, 2019 – 2021)

WB network programming

Newscasts and local programming from WGN-TV
Bozo's Circus (1978–80)
John Drury and Newsnine (simulcast of former 10 p.m. newscast; 1978–September 1980)
Nightbeat (simulcast of former late night newscast; 1978–83)
Ray Rayner and His Friends (1978–81)
The Bozo Show (1980–94)
WGN News at Nine (formerly The Nine O'Clock News; simulcast of 9 p.m. newscast; September 1980–January 30, 2014)
WGN Midday News (formerly Chicago's Midday News and WGN News at Noon; simulcast of noon-1 p.m. CT portion, 1983–2014)
Heritage of Faith (1983–92)
Chicago's Very Own (1988–92)
$100,000 Fortune Hunt (1989–94)
People to People (1990–2014)
U.S. Farm Report (1992–2007)
WGN Weekend Morning News (Saturday edition, 1992–98; Sunday edition, 1992–94)
The Bozo Super Sunday Show (1994–2001)
Illinois Instant Riches/Illinois' Luckiest (1994–2000)
WGN Morning News (simulcast of morning newscast; September 6, 1994 – 1997 and February 3-December 12, 2014)
Adelante, Chicago (1995–2014)

Original programming
Cultivating Life (April 2006 - September 2010)
The Bob & Tom Show (November 3, 2008 – September 10, 2010)
Around the World for Free (2009–10)
WWE Superstars (April 16, 2009 – April 7, 2011)
Sky Dives (2009)

Sports programming
WGN-TV Chicago, through its WGN Sports department, holds the broadcast rights to the following sports telecasts, which were discontinued from airing on WGN America as of December 15, 2014:
Chicago Bulls NBA basketball games 1
Chicago Cubs Major League Baseball games 1
Chicago White Sox Major League Baseball games 1

Short-form programming
Earl Pitts Uhmerikun (April 2010–November 2011)

Movie presentations
Family Classics (Sunday afternoons 1962–2000)
Creature Features (Saturday nights 1970–76)
WGN Presents (1987-2003)
WGN Action Theater (Saturday late nights; 1993–2002)
WGN Matinee Theater (weekend afternoons; 1993–2002)
Way Back Wednesday (Wednesday evenings; 2007–10)
Movie Underground (Friday evenings; 2008–10)

Annual specials
Bozo, Gar and Ray: WGN TV Classics (each Thanksgiving, Christmas Eve and Christmas Day)
Bud Billiken Parade (each August on the second Saturday of the month)
Chicago St. Patrick's Day Parade
Live from Daryl's House: A New Year's Eve Special (2010)
McDonald's Thanksgiving Parade (each November)
MDA Show of Strength (1978–2012; each Labor Day weekend)
Mummers Parade (tape delay of New Year's Day parade)
Tournament of Roses Parade (simulcast from sister station KTLA in Los Angeles; each New Year's Day, currently only on WGN-TV)
Yule Log (each Christmas morning; also aired on most Tribune-owned stations, currently on WGN-TV but not on WGN America)

Religious programming

Sunday Mass (1980–92)
Robert Schuller (1981–92)
Kenneth Copeland (1989–90; 1992–2011)
Oral Roberts (1990–2001)
Believer's Voice of Victory (1992–94; 2003–09)
In Touch with Dr. Charles Stanley (1992–99)
Jack Van Impe (1992–2007)
The Key of David (1992–2017)
Winning Walk (1992–2003)
Life in the Word (1993–2004)
Jimmy Swaggart (1996–2010)
Fresh Fire with Dennis Burke (1997–98)
Jerry Savelle (1997–98)
Singsation 1 (1997–2018)
Winning in Life (1997–99)
Changing Your World with Creflo Dollar (2001–2021)
Enjoying Everyday Life with Joyce Meyer (2001–2017)
Believer's Walk of Faith with Pastor Bill Winston 1 (2006–08)
Amazing Facts (2007–2014)
Campmeeting

References

WGN America